Ludwichowo may refer to the following places:
Ludwichowo, Grudziądz County in Kuyavian-Pomeranian Voivodeship (north-central Poland)
Ludwichowo, Gmina Cekcyn in Kuyavian-Pomeranian Voivodeship (north-central Poland)
Ludwichowo, Gmina Kęsowo in Kuyavian-Pomeranian Voivodeship (north-central Poland)
Ludwichowo, Warmian-Masurian Voivodeship (north Poland)